The Ryukyus Stingrays football program represents University of the Ryukyus in college football. Ryukyus is a member of the Kyūshū Collegiate American Football Association.

References

External links
 
American football in Japan
1987 establishments in Japan
American football teams established in 1987